Sun Wanrong (died 697) was a khan of the Khitans who, along with his brother-in-law Li Jinzhong, rose against Wu Zhou hegemony in 696, with Li Jinzhong as khan, and they further invaded Wu Zhou territory. After Li Jinzhong's death later in 696, Sun succeeded him and continued to be successful against the forces sent against him by Wu Zetian, but in 697, after the Tujue khan Ashina Mochuo successfully launched a surprise attack against Sun's headquarters, Sun's forces collapsed, and he was killed, ending the Khitan rebellion.

In popular culture
 Portrayed by Cho In-pyo in the 2006-2007 KBS TV series Dae Jo Yeong.

697 deaths
Year of birth unknown
7th-century Khitan people
Khitan people in Tang dynasty